Huntersfield Mountain is a mountain located in the Catskill Mountains of New York north-northwest of Ashland. Ashland Pinnacle is located east, and Tower Mountain is located south-southeast of Huntersfield Mountain. It is the highest point in Schoharie County and it is ranked 9 of 62 on the list of New York County High Points.

References

Mountains of Greene County, New York
Mountains of New York (state)
Mountains of Schoharie County, New York